Thankot is a village and former Village Development Committee that is now part of Chandragiri Municipality in Kathmandu District in Province No. 3 of central Nepal. It lies in the lap of Chandragiri Hill. According to the 2011 Nepal census it has a population of 12,047 and has 2,820 households.

Some of the main attractions include Tribhuwan Park, Narayan Temple, Mahalaxmi Temple, and Chandragiri Hill.

References 

Populated places in Kathmandu District